Vlaardingen is a city in South Holland in the Netherlands. It is located on the north bank of the Nieuwe Maas river at the confluence with the Oude Maas.

Geography
The city is divided into a northern part (locally known as the "Holy") and a southern part by the A20 motorway. On the east the city is separated from Schiedam by the A4 motorway. Other places nearby are Maassluis to the west, Schipluiden and Delft to the north, Schiedam and Rotterdam to the east and Spijkenisse in the south-west, on the other side of the Nieuwe Maas. The A20 connects  Rotterdam to Hook of Holland. The Beneluxtunnel (the tunnel that runs under the Nieuwe Waterweg) connects the A20 to the A15.

The centre of the town is on the west side of the old harbour, which is originally a stream ('De Vlaarding') from the peat lands north and east of the town, running to the Meuse estuary.

History
The area around Vlaardingen was already settled by about 2900 to 2600 BC. In 1990, a skeleton dated at about 1300 BC was dug up in the periphery of Vlaardingen; some human nuclear DNA was identified, the oldest found anywhere in the Netherlands. Although in the Roman Age a stronghold or maybe even a vicus Flenio must have been found in nowadays Vlaardingen, between roughly 250 CE and 700 CE the region seems to have been uninhabited, like much of the west of the Netherlands. In 726 or 727 the area is again mentioned as In Pagio Marsum, where a little church was established, around which Vlaardingen formed. The church is mentioned on a list of churches Willibrord, the Apostle to the Frisians, inhered to the Abbey of Echternach.

In 1018 Vlaardingen was a stronghold of Dirk III, who levied an illegal toll on ships on the Meuse river. An army sent by German Emperor Henry II in order to stop this practice was defeated by Dirk III in the (First) Battle of Vlaardingen. In 1047, his successor Dirk IV repelled another such attack (Second Battle of Vlaardingen). The first of these battles was commemorated in 2018 by a historical reenactment

The flood disaster of December 21, 1163 (Saint Thomas Flood), ended the growth of Vlaardingen. The Counts of Holland moved away and its development stagnated.

It is known that in 1273 Vlaardingen was granted city rights by Floris V, Count of Holland. Older city rights are possible, but not provable.

In 1574, during the Eighty Years War of Dutch independence, a group of Watergeuzen burnt down Vlaardingen as commanded by William of Orange to prevent the Spanish from capturing the town. Vlaardingen later became a shipbuilding area and a significant harbour for the herring fishing industry. The fishing boats (originally "haringbuizen", later also "sloepen" and "loggers") ceased to use Vlaardingen in the years after World War II.

In 1855 the former municipality of Zouteveen was merged into the municipality Vlaardingerambacht which in turn was merged with Vlaardingen during the occupation of the Netherlands in the Second World War by the Germans in 1941.

Because of the industrialization in and close to Vlaardingen, the city suffered from heavy air pollution and, sometimes, pathogenic smog during the 1970s. One day, a high school had to be closed because of the smog. Many environmental groups arose in and around Vlaardingen as it was seen as one of the most polluted cities of the country.
 
Vlaardingen consists of eight districts/neighbourhoods:
Vlaardingen Centrum
Westwijk
Vettenoordse polder (includes industry)
Vlaardingen Oost
Ambacht/Babberspolder
Holy Zuid
Holy Noord
Broekpolder

Politics
Mayor: Bert Wijbenga (VVD).

Seats in the city council after the municipal elections in 2010:
 Labour Party (PvdA), 6 seats
 Vlaardingen Ahead 2000/Livable Vlaardingen (VV2000/LV), 6 seats
 Groenlinks (GL), 4 seats
 People's Party for Freedom and Democracy (VVD), 4 seats
 Christian Democratic Appeal (CDA), 3 seats
 Socialist Party (SP), 3 seats
 Democrats 66 (D66), 2 seats
 Christian Union/Political Reformed Party (CU/SGP), 2 seats
 City Interests Vlaardingen (SBV), 2 seats
 Proud of the Netherlands (TON), 2 seats
 General Elderly Alliance (AOV), 1 seat

Economy

A Unilever research centre is located in Vlaardingen (located next to the former Sunlight factory, later called Lever Faberge Sourcing Unit Vlaardingen). There are still some ship repair business(es) in Eastern Vlaardingen beside the Nieuwe Maas River. The  was for many years the largest privately owned artificial harbour in the world. The last major herring factory, Warmelo & Van Der Drift, left Vlaardingen in the middle of 2012 to relocate to Katwijk aan Zee. There are still some ferry terminals (DFDS Seaways, sailing to Felixstowe and Immingham and P&O Ferries sailing to Hull).

Attractions

Monuments

Historical buildings in the town include the Grote Kerk (Big Church), the Waag (Weighing Bridge) next to the church and the old town hall (used for weddings), all on the Markt, the former marketplace, the Visbank (Fish Auction) at the harbour and the Oude Lijnbaan (Old Ropewalk, where ropes were made). The Grote Kerk was probably established between 1156 and 1164 and has been expanded, damaged and rebuilt. To the north of the old harbour is the old Aeolus windmill,  which operates and sells ground cereals. The harbour  is a marina and open-air museum with old ships. A war memorial to the crew of a Wellington bomber from No. 142 Squadron RAF killed when it was shot down over Vlaardingen in March 1942 has been erected in Wijkpark Holy-Noord in June 2012.

On Emaus Cemetery in Vlaardinger Ambacht six members of the resistance group "Geuzen" are buried. They were executed in March 1941. Nine adjacent headstones are symbolic for nine other members of the "Geuzen" who were also executed and buried elsewhere.

Events
The "Vlaardings Loggerfestival" (Logger is a traditional ship used for herring fishery, the customary English name is lugger) is held on the first Saturday of June. The festival used to be called "Haring en Bierfeest" (translation: herring and beer festival), but in 2003 the mayor decided to rename it. In 2015, the name "Haring en Bierfeest" reappeared again.

Since 1987, the Geuzenpenning is an award that is yearly bestowed by a local foundation in cooperation with the town's municipality to human rights activists from all over the world.

Notable residents
People who are born in or (have) lived in Vlaardingen:

Counts of Holland 
 Floris I, Count of Holland (ca.1017-1061) Count of Holland then called Frisia, 1049-1061
 Dirk IV, Count of Holland (ca.1025–1049) was Count of Holland 1039–1049, then called Frisia
 Dirk V, Count of Holland (1052–1091) was Count of Holland 10611091, then called Frisia
 Floris II, Count of Holland (ca.1085-1121) Count of Holland 1091-1121

Public thinking & Public Service 
 Gerard Callenburgh (1642–1722) was a Dutch admiral and town councillor and Burgomaster
 Koos Vorrink (1891–1955) a Dutch politician 
 Cornelis Moerman (1893-1988) a general practitioner and keen pigeon fancier
 Catharina Halkes (1920-2011) a Dutch theologian and feminist
 Dirk Hoogendam (1922-2003) a Dutch war criminal
 Geert Mak (born 1946) a Dutch journalist and a non-fiction writer about history
 Agnes van Ardenne (born 1950) a retired Dutch politician and diplomat
 Wouter Bos (born 1963) a retired Dutch politician, former Deputy Prime Minister 2007-2010
 Kees van der Staaij (born 1968) a Dutch politician
 Arjan El Fassed (born 1973) a former Dutch politician, human rights activist, a development aid worker and director of Open State Foundation

The Arts 
 Dolf van der Linden (1915–1999) a Dutch conductor of popular music 
 Bassie en Adriaan, (brothers, born 1935 & 1942) actors in a children's TV show
 Gerrit Berveling (born 1944) a Dutch Esperanto author
 Threes Anna (born 1959) a novelist, theatre and film maker
 Hans Neleman (born 1960) an international photographer and film director from Connecticut
 Martyn LeNoble (born 1969) a Dutch bassist and a founding member of the alternative rock band Porno for Pyros
 Karen Mulder (born 1970) a Dutch model, singer and former supermodel
 Rik van de Westelaken (born 1971) a Dutch TV presenter
 Rajacenna van Dam (born 1994) a Dutch hyper realistic pencil drawing artist

Science & Business 
 Ericus Verkade (1835–1907) a Dutch businessman, founded Verkade manufacturing company
 Hans Bos (born 1950) a Dutch biochemist, cancer researcher and academic
 Roel Pieper (born 1956) a Dutch IT-entrepreneur
 Aad van der Vaart (born 1959) a Dutch professor of stochastics at Leiden University
 Martinus van der Knaap (born 1959) a Dutch marine biologist and sustainable development officer at FAO of The UN
 Menno Schilthuizen (born 1965) a Dutch evolutionary biologist, ecologist and academic researcher
 Jim Stolze (born 1973) a tech-entrepreneur at Amsterdam Science Park and with TEDx

Sport 

 Andries Hoogerwerf (1906–1977) a middle-distance runner in the 1928 Summer Olympics, later a scientist and conservationist in the Dutch East Indies 
 Rudie Liebrechts (born 1941) a Dutch former speed skater and racing cyclist
 Paul-Jan Bakker (born 1957) a former Dutch cricketer
 Juliette Bergmann (born 1958) a Dutch female bodybuilding former champion
 Wim Koevermans (born 1960) a former football central defender with 340 club caps
 Harald Wapenaar (born 1970) a Dutch former football goalkeeper with 341 club caps
 Caroline Vis (born 1970) a retired professional tennis player
 Frank Kooiman (born 1970) a retired Dutch football goalkeeper with about 310 club caps
 Wilma van Hofwegen (born 1971) a former freestyle swimmer, team silver medallist at the 2000 Summer Olympics
 Serge Zwikker (born 1973) a Dutch-American former basketball player.
 Mark Huizinga (born 1973) a Dutch judoka champion and gold medallist at the 2000 Summer Olympics and bronze medallist at the 1996 and 2004 Summer Olympics
 Daniëlle de Bruijn (born 1978) a water polo player, team gold medallist at the 2008 Summer Olympics 
 Edith Bosch (born 1980) a Dutch judoka, silver medallist at the 2004 Summer Olympics and bronze medallist at the 2008 and 2012 Summer Olympics
 Chantal Achterberg (born 1985) a Dutch rower, team bronze medallist at the 2012 Summer Olympics and team silver medalist at the 2016 Summer Olympics
 Carlo van Dam (born 1986) a Dutch racing driver
 Kevin de Koning (born 1994) a Dutch professional Starcraft II player

Twin city

Gallery

See also
Vlaardingse Vaart Bridge

References

External links

   (English version)
  The history of Vlaardingen website

 
Cities in the Netherlands
Municipalities of South Holland
Populated places in South Holland